Geni or GENI may refer to:

 Geni.com, a genealogy-related web service
 Geni (footballer) (b. 1980), Spanish football (soccer) player, full name Eugenio Suárez Santos
 Global Environment for Network Innovations, a planned National Science Foundation facilities project
 Global Energy Network Institute, a research and education organization focusing on electric power transmission networks between nations and continents
 Geni, Siliguri, a census town in Darjeeling district, West Bengal, India

See also
Genie (disambiguation)